The Northern Pacific Depot in Hinckley, Minnesota, United States, is a wood-framed depot built in 1895, the year after the previous depot was destroyed in the Great Hinckley Fire on September 1, 1894. The depot was built from the plans of the previous depot. It was listed on the National Register of Historic Places in 1973. The building was originally built by the St. Paul and Duluth Railroad, which was acquired by the Northern Pacific Railway in 1900. The building had separate men's and women's waiting rooms, a freight room, a restaurant known as the "Beanery", and a stationmaster's living quarters on the second floor.

Passenger train service to Hinckley station ended on January 4, 1967, when trains 65 and 66 were discontinued between the Twin Cities and Duluth.

The depot is now known as the Hinckley Fire Museum. It also explains how the town was rebuilt and how the area shifted to agricultural use after the lumbering era ended.

References

External links

Hinckley Fire Museum

Firefighting museums in the United States
History museums in Minnesota
Museums in Pine County, Minnesota
Hinckley
Railway stations on the National Register of Historic Places in Minnesota
Railway stations in the United States opened in 1895
National Register of Historic Places in Pine County, Minnesota
1895 establishments in Minnesota
Hinckley
Railway stations closed in 1967
Firefighting in Minnesota